Indian Institute of Technology Kharagpur (IIT Kharagpur) is a public institute of technology established by the Government of India in Kharagpur, West Bengal, India. Established in 1951, the institute is the first of the IITs to be established and is recognised as an Institute of National Importance. In 2019 it was awarded the status of Institute of Eminence by the Government of India.

The institute was initially established to train engineers after India attained independence in 1947. However, over the years, the institute's academic capabilities diversified with offerings in management, law, architecture, humanities, etc. IIT Kharagpur has an  campus and has about 22,000 residents.

History

Foundation 
In 1946, a committee by Sir Jogendra Singh, Member of Viceroy's executive council, to consider the creation of higher technical institutions "for post-World War II industrial development of India". This was followed by the creation of a 22-member committee headed by Nalini Ranjan Sarkar. In its interim report, the Sarkar Committee recommended the establishment of higher technical institutions in India, along the lines of the Massachusetts Institute of Technology and consulting from the University of Illinois at Urbana–Champaign along with affiliated secondary institutions. The report urged that work should start with the speedy establishment of major institutions in the four-quarters of the country with the ones in the east and the west to be set up immediately.

On the grounds that West Bengal had the highest concentration of industries at the time, Bidhan Chandra Roy, the Chief Minister of West Bengal, persuaded Jawaharlal Nehru (India's first prime minister) to establish the first institute in West Bengal. The first Indian Institute of Technology was thus established in May 1950 as the Eastern Higher Technical Institute. Hijli had been used as a detention camp during the period of British rule in India, where Indian independence activists were imprisoned.

IIT Kharagpur is the 4th oldest technical institute in the West Bengal state after Indian Institute of Engineering Science and Technology Shibpur (established as B.E. College in 1856), Jadavpur University (established as Bengal technical institute in 1906) and Rajabazar Science College (established as Calcutta University campus for Science and Technology in 1914). When the first session started in August 1951, there were 224 students and 42 teachers in the ten departments of the institute. The classrooms, laboratories and the administrative office were housed in the historic building of the Hijli Detention Camp (now known as Shaheed Bhawan), where political revolutionaries were imprisoned during the period of British colonial rule. The office building had served as the headquarters of the Bomber Command of the U.S. 20th Air Force during World War II.

Early developments 
The name "Indian Institute of Technology" was adopted before the formal inauguration of the institute on 18 August 1951 by Maulana Abul Kalam Azad. On 18 May 1956 a Bill (Bill no 36 of 1956) was introduced in Lok Sabha to declare the institution known as the Indian Institute of Technology, Kharagpur to be an institution of national importance and to provide for its incorporation and matters connected therewith. The motto of the institute, योगः कर्मसु कौशलम् is taken from the Bhagavad Gita, Chapter 2, Verse 50 and it has been translated by Sri Aurobindo as "Yoga is skill in works". On 15 September 1956, Indian Institute of Technology (Kharagpur) Act, 195 of Parliament received the assent of the President. Prime Minister Nehru, in the first convocation address of IIT Kharagpur said:
The Shaheed Bhawan was converted to a museum in 1990.

The Srinivasa Ramanujan Complex was incorporated as another academic complex of the institute with Takshashila starting operation in 2002, Vikramshila in 2003 and Nalanda in 2012. Earlier the Hijli Detention camp building, now named as Hijli Saheed Bhavan, where the Nehru Museum of Science & Technology is located is an imposing building, bearing resemblance to the Byzantine style of architecture.

Campus 
The campus is located five kilometres away from Kharagpur Railway Station in West Midnapore district. The layout of the present campus and the design of the buildings were carried out by a group of engineers and architects under the guidance of Werner M. Moser, a Swiss architect. The  campus is residence to about 22,000 inhabitants. In 2015, IIT Kharagpur had about 605 faculty members, 1,933 employees and approximately 10,010 students living on the campus. The Institute plans to go Green by 2020.

The 22 student hostels are located on either side of Scholars Avenue, which extends from the institute gate to the B. C. Roy Technology Hospital. The three earliest halls—Patel, Azad, and Nehru—together constitute the PAN loop or Old Campus, which is located just next to Scholar's Avenue. There are ten hostels for undergraduate male students (MMM, LBS, RP, RK, MS, LLR, HJB, Patel, Azad and Nehru) and two for undergraduate female students (SN/IG and MT). There are a few post-graduate students' hostels including four for women(RLB, Gokhle, Nivedita and SAM) and hostels for research scholars (BCR, VS, BRH and JCB) and a separate hostel for scholars from the armed forces. The Jnan Ghosh stadium and Tata Sports Complex host large-scale sports competitions. The Tagore Open Air Theatre has a capacity of 6,000 people, and is used to host cultural programs. The Science and Technology Entrepreneurs' Park (STEP) provides infrastructure facilities to alumni who want to become entrepreneurs but lack infrastructure to start their own corporation.

In addition to the main campus at Kharagpur, the institute has an extension centre at Kolkata to provide venues for continuing education programmes, distance learning courses, and guesthouse accommodation. The institute has Kolkata extension centre at Rajarhat and usea it to offer some full-time undergraduate and postgraduate courses. The  Rajarhat campus houses 2,500 students.

The Ministry of human resource development on 5 September 2019 awarded "Institute of Eminence" status to IIT Kharagpur along with four public institution in India, which will enable to get full autonomy and special incentives.

Academic buildings 
IIT Kharagpur has 19 academic departments, eight multi-disciplinary centres/schools, and 13 schools of excellence in addition to more than 25 central research and development units. Apart from the main building in the central academic complex, the Srinivasa Ramanujan Complex also has common academic facilities. In the S. R. Complex, the Takshashila building houses the G. S. Sanyal School of Telecommunication, the School of Information Technology and the Computer and Informatics Centre; and has facilities for conducting lecture classes as well. Vikramshila is another academic building in the S. R. Complex, having four lecture halls, several seminar rooms, and Kalidas Auditorium, which has a seating capacity of 850. The School of Medical Science and Technology is housed in the basement of the Vikramshila building.

The institute main building houses most of the administrative offices, the lecture halls, and two auditoriums on either side. The signage at the front displays the message," Dedicated to the service of the nation." The tower of the main building has a steel tank with 10,000 imperial gallons of water capacity for emergency supply needs. The Netaji Auditorium in the main building is used for official functions and events, and doubles as a cinema theatre on weekend nights, showing films to the IIT community at subsidised rates.

IIT Kharagpur's first library was located in a small room of the institute's Old Building (Shaheed Bhawan). At the time of its opening in 1951, the library had a collection of 2,500 books. Now located in the main building of the institute, the Central Library is one of the largest of its type. Its collection includes over 350,000 books and documents, and it subscribes to more than 1,600 printed and online journals and conference proceedings.

The library has six halls and a section exclusively for SC and ST students. The library's collection consists of books, reports, conference proceedings, back volumes of periodicals, standards, theses, micro-forms, DVDs, CD-ROMs, and audio-visual material. The library's transaction service is automated and online searches are possible through an Online Public Access Catalog (OPAC). The Electronic Library section has a collection of databases, video lectures and miscellaneous other resources.

The Nehru Museum of Science and Technology has over a hundred indoor exhibits that include technical models collected from institutions across India. The park outside the museum contains 14 open-air demonstrations and outdoor exhibits, including a hunter plane and a steam engine. The museum has an archive room, showing documents relating to the history of the institute and West Midnapore district. The Rural Museum, located in the Rural Development Centre of the institute, has a collection of exhibits in local culture.

Civic amenities 
The institute campus has six guest houses, a civic hospital, four nationalised banks, four schools(Hijli High School; Kendriya Vidyalaya; D.A.V Model School; St. Agnes Branch School), a railway reservation counter and a police station. The campus has a water pumping station, electrical sub-station, telephone exchange, a market, six restaurants, and a garbage disposal section for the daily needs of the residents. Construction is going on for another guest house and a convention centre having a capacity of 2,000. The institute draws its supply of water from wells near the Kosai river (located 112 kilometres away from institute) by harnessing sub-surface water. Three deep wells near the institute supplement the supply from the river. The water is supplied by a  pipeline to 12 tanks in the campus with a total capacity of 2,800,000 litres (615,000 imperial gallons). However students in 2009 had shown dissatisfaction with the level of amenities, especially the civic hospital, forcing the director to resign.

IIT Kharagpur is located just outside the town of Kharagpur, in the Hijli village. The civic amenities provided to the campus of IIT Kharagpur make it nearly self-sufficient with regards to the basic needs of the residents. As Kharagpur is a small town, there is limited direct interaction between the campus community and the town. There is also little opportunity for the employment of family members of the faculty. Unlike some other IITs (such as IIT Bombay), IIT Kharagpur does not restrict outsiders' entry into the campus. IIT Kharagpur provides much of its benefits to the local community through the Rural Development Centre (RDC) located in the campus. Established in 1975, the RDC helps the local community by developing customised technologies. The RDC also co-ordinates the National Service Scheme (NSS) programs in IIT Kharagpur, with the members of NSS taking part in weekly community service activities such as sanitation, road construction, teaching and building educational models.

In 2005, IIT Kharagpur started construction of a boundary wall for the security of the campus, which is now complete. Mild restrictions apply to entry of outside vehicles. The boundary wall was opposed by the local community as it would hinder their access to amenities provided by the institute. Campus residents have also been denied direct access to the adjoining Hijli railway station as a result of this wall. The local community opposed the construction of a flyover from the railway station to the campus formerly, under the pretext that it would lead to substantial losses of opportunity for the shops along the roads. After the flyover construction had been completed and became operational, things ensued in a manner as the local community had anticipated, but the flyover has resulted in more convenience for transport.

Halls of residence

IIT Kharagpur provides on-campus residential facilities to its students, research scholars, faculty members and many of its staff. The students live in hostels (referred to as halls) throughout their stay in the IIT. Hostel rooms are wired for internet, for which students pay a compulsory charge. Most of the rooms in the older halls of residences are designed to accommodate one student, but an increase in the number of incoming undergraduate students has led to shared rooms in the first two years. The new rooms of Lal Bahadur Shastri Hall and new blocks of few other hall of residence accommodate three students in one room. The oldest Halls of Residence are located in the PAN Loop, named after the Patel, Azad, and Nehru Halls.

The halls of IIT Kharagpur are:
 Ashutosh Mukherjee Hall
 Azad Hall
 Bidhan Chandra Roy Hall
 B R Ambedkar Hall
 Gokhale Hall
 Homi Jehangir Bhabha Hall
 Acharya Jagadish Chandra Bose Hall
 Lala Lajpat Rai Hall
 Lal Bahadur Shashtri Hall
 Madan Mohan Malviya Hall
 Meghnad Saha Hall
 Mother Teresa Hall
 Nehru Hall
 Patel Hall
 Radhakrishnan Hall
 Rajendra Prasad Hall
 Rani Laxmibai Hall
 Sarojini Naidu / Indira Gandhi Hall
 Sister Nivedita Hall
 Vikram Sarabhai Residential complex
 Vikram Sarabhai Residential complex 2
 Vidyasagar Hall
 Zakir Hussain Hall

Undergraduate students choose between National Cadet Corps (NCC), National Service Scheme (NSS) and National Sports Organisation (NSO) or National Cultural Appreciation(NCA) for their first two years of study. IIT Kharagpur has common sports grounds for cricket, football, hockey, one court for volleyball, two for lawn tennis, four indoor badminton court, tracks for athletics; and swimming pools for aquatic events. Most of the hostels have their own sports grounds. The institute used to organise Shaurya, an annual inter-collegiate sports and games meet during October which was discontinued in 2012.

Organisation and administration

Governance 

IIT Kharagpur shares a common Visitor (a position held by the president of India) and the IIT Council with other IITs. The rest of IIT Kharagpur's organisational structure is distinct from that of the other IITs. The Board of Governors of IIT Kharagpur is under the IIT Council, and has 13 members that include representatives of the states of West Bengal, Bihar, Jharkhand and Odisha, in addition to other members appointed by the IIT Council and the institute's senate. Under the Board of Governors is the institute director, who serves as the chief academic and executive officer of the IIT. He is aided by the deputy director. Under the director and the deputy director are the deans, heads of departments, registrar, president of the students' council, and chairman of the Hall Management Committee. The registrar is the chief administrative officer and oversees day-to-day operations. He is the custodian of records, funds, and other properties of the institute. Under the charge of the heads of departments (HOD) are the faculty (full-time professors as well as those of associate and assistant status). The wardens of hostels are placed under the chairman of the hall management committee in the organisation.

IIT Kharagpur receives comparatively more funding than other engineering colleges in India. Other sources of funds include student fees and research funding by industry-sponsored projects. IIT Kharagpur provide scholarships to all MTech students and research scholars to encourage them to pursue higher studies.

The academic policies of IIT Kharagpur are decided by its senate. It consists of all professors of the institute, and administrative and student representatives. The senate controls and approves the curriculum, courses, examinations and results, and appoints committees to look into specific academic matters. The teaching, training and research activities of the institute are periodically reviewed by the senate to maintain educational standards. The Director of IIT Kharagpur is the ex officio chairman of the Institute Senate.

Departments
 Aerospace Engineering
 Agricultural & Food Engineering
 Architecture & Regional Planning
 Biotechnology
 Chemical Engineering
 Chemistry
 Civil Engineering
 Computer Science & Engineering
 Electrical Engineering
 Electronics & Electrical Communication Engineering
 Geology & Geophysics
 Humanities & Social Sciences
 Industrial & Systems Engineering
 Mathematics
 Mechanical Engineering
 Metallurgical & Materials Engineering
 Mining Engineering
 Ocean Engineering & Naval Architecture
 Physics

Centres
 Rubber Technology
 Steel Technology Centre
 Reliability Engineering
 Cryogenic Engineering
 Materials Science
 Oceans, Rivers, Atmosphere and Land Sciences
 Rural Development Centre
 Advanced Technology Development Centre
 Centre for Educational Technology
 Rekhi Centre for Science of Happiness
 Deysarkar Centre Excellence in Petroleum Engineering
 AI Centre of Excellence

Schools
 School of Medical Science and Technology
 School of Bioscience
 School of Energy Science
 School of Environmental Science and Engineering
 G S Sanyal School of Telecommunications
 Rajendra Mishra School of Engineering Entrepreneurship
 Rajiv Gandhi School of Intellectual Property Law
 Ranbir and Chitra Gupta School of Infrastructure Design and Management
 Medical Science & Technology
 School of Water Resources

Academics 

Admission to most undergraduate and postgraduate courses in IIT Kharagpur is granted through written entrance examinations. Admissions to M.S.(by Research) and PhD programmes are based on written tests followed by personal interviews.

Admission to undergraduate programmes in all IITs was tied to the Indian Institute of Technology Joint Entrance Examination (IIT-JEE). Since 2013 students have to pass JEE Advanced in order to be admitted to undergraduate courses at IITs. But before they can sit for JEE Advanced, they have to qualify JEE (Mains). Candidates who qualify for admission through IIT-JEE used to apply for admission in four-year BTech (Bachelor of Technology), five-year BArch degree, five-year Dual Degree (Integrated Bachelor of Technology and Master of Technology) and four year BS Bachelor of Science courses at IIT Kharagpur. The admissions to postgraduate programmes (MTech) are made primarily through the Graduate Aptitude Test in Engineering (GATE). Other postgraduate entrance exams include Joint Admission to MSc (JAM) for MSc, and Common Admission Test (CAT) conducted by IIMs for management studies.

15% of the seats are reserved for students belonging to Scheduled Castes (SC) and 7.5% for Scheduled Tribes (ST).  As of 2008, 27% separate reservation exists for the Other Backward Classes.

IIT Kharagpur is a member of LAOTSE, a network of universities in Europe and Asia exchanging students and senior scholars.

Undergraduate education 

IIT Kharagpur offers degrees as part of its undergraduate programmes. They include Bachelor of Technology (BTech.Hons), Bachelor of Architecture (BArch) and the 5-year integrated Master of Science. The BTech degree is the most common undergraduate degree in IIT Kharagpur in terms of student enrolment. It is based on a four-year programme with eight semesters. The first year of the BTech curriculum has common courses from various departments. At the end of the first year, an option to change departments is given to students on the basis of their performance in the first two semesters. Like other IITs which evaluate their students on the basis of others' performance IIT Kharagpur also uses relative grading.

From the second year onwards, the students take courses offered by their departments that are known as depth courses. In addition to these, the students take inter-disciplinary courses known as breadth courses. Separate courses from the humanities and social sciences (HSS) department, and management and information technology are also required. At the end of the third year for the BTech and fourth year for the dual degree, students undertake industrial training for a minimum period of eight working weeks as part of the undergraduate curriculum. In the final year of their studies, most of the students are offered jobs in industries and other organisations through the Training and Placement section of the institute commonly known as Career Development Centre or CDC. Some students opt out of this facility in favour of higher studies or by applying to recruiting organisations directly. In addition to the major degree as part of the undergraduate education, students can take courses from other departments, and by demonstrating knowledge of a discipline based on objectives set by the department, earn a minor in that department. To stay up-to-date with the latest academic and industry standards, IIT Kharagpur revamps its academic curriculum periodically. In August 2017, an Undergraduate Council(UG Council) was constituted by the institute under the Dean of Undergraduate Studies(Dean UGS) as its chairman and with one student representative from each department to be elected/nominated for an annual term, to assist in the process of curriculum update, assimilate student feedback on different academic policies, and forward suggestions and proposals to the institute senate.

Postgraduate and doctoral education 

IIT Kharagpur offers postgraduate programmes including Master of Technology (MTech), Master of Business Administration (MBA), and Master of Sciences (MSc). Some specialised post graduate programmes offered by IIT Kharagpur include Master of Human Resource Management (MHRM), Postgraduate Diploma in Information Technology (PGDIT), Master in Medical Science and Technology (MMST), Master of City Planning (MCP), LL.B in Intellectual Property Law (LL.B Honors in IP Law), and Postgraduate Diploma in Maritime Operation and Management (PGDMOM). The institute offers the Doctor of Philosophy degree (PhD) as part of its doctoral education programme. The doctoral scholars are given a topic by the professor, or work on the consultancy projects sponsored by industry. The duration of the programme is usually unspecified and depends on the discipline. PhD scholars submit a dissertation as well as conduct an oral defence of their thesis. Teaching assistantships (TA) and research assistantships (RA) are provided based on the scholar's academic profile. IIT Kharagpur offers an M.S. (by research) programme; the MTech and M.S. being similar to the US universities' non-thesis (course-based) and thesis (research-based) master programmes respectively.

IIT Kharagpur (along with other IITs) offers Dual Degree programs that integrate undergraduate and postgraduate studies in selected pairs of branches and specialisations. Most of the Dual Degree programs involve specialisation in the major field of education of the student. For a dual degree involving an MBA from Vinod Gupta School of Management, the selection is made on the basis of an aptitude test of students across all engineering streams. The Dual Degree program spans five years as against six years in conventional BTech (four years) followed by an MTech or MBA (two years).

IIT Kharagpur has a management school (Vinod Gupta School of Management), an entrepreneurship school (Rajendra Mishra School of Engineering Entrepreneurship) and a law school (Rajiv Gandhi School of Intellectual Property Law) on its premises. The Rajiv Gandhi School of Intellectual Property Law has been opened in collaboration with George Washington University. Rajiv Gandhi School of Intellectual Property Law is the only law school in IIT System of the country. The School of Medical Science and Technology at IIT Kharagpur is the first and also the "only" of its kind in the country where M.B.B.S. graduates are trained in art and science of medical research with aim to provide a platform for interdisciplinary teaching and research in the field of medical science and technology. The institute is expected to start the course in 2017 which will be recognised by Medical Council of India (MCI).

IIT Kharagpur also offers a unique, tri-institute programme, Post Graduate Diploma in Business Analytics (PGDBA), in association with IIM Calcutta and ISI Kolkata, which is ranked 14th globally as per QS World University Ranking 2019.

In 2021, IIT Kharagpur and The University of Manchester entered into strategic partnership and launched a dual award PhD programme.

Continuing education 
The institute offers the Continuing Education Programme (CEP) for qualified engineers and scientists to learn technologies and developments in their academic disciplines. As part of CEP, the institute offers formal degree programmes (MTech and PhD) and an Early Faculty Induction Programme (EFIP) under the Quality Improvement Programme (QIP), short-term courses supported by the All India Council for Technical Education, self-financed short-term courses supported by course fees, and certificate courses conducted as distance education. In addition to conducting educational courses, the CEP develops model curricula for engineering education. As of 2006, the CEP has facilitated publication of 103 course curriculum books. The CEP administers SIMAP (Small Industries Management Assistant Programme) and STUP (Skill-cum-Technology Upgradation Programme) on behalf of IIT Kharagpur; the institute being a corpus institute of SIDBI (Small Industries Development Bank of India).

Sponsored research 

The institute received 171 research revenue worth —and 130 consultancy projects in the 2005–06 session. The institute transferred 15 technologies to industry during the same session. The institute has filed 125 patents and 25 of them have been granted. This does not include patents obtained by individual professors or students. The institute earned  from research projects in the 2005–06 session. Major sponsors for research include the Indian Ordnance Factories, Indian National Science Academy, Ministry of Human Resource and Development, Defence Research and Development Organisation, Microsoft Corporation, Department of Science and Technology, Ministry of Communications and Information Technology (India) and Indian Space Research Organisation. IIT Kharagpur has had a cell known as the SRIC (Sponsored Research and Industrial Consultancy) cell since 1982. It handles sponsored research projects and industrial consultancy assignments, and has the infrastructure to simultaneously administer 600 R&D projects.

Indira Gandhi Centre for Atomic Research has entered into a collaboration with IIT Kharagpur to carry out research for the design and development of Fast Breeder Reactors (FBRs). This is a major development that will boost the second stage of India's nuclear power programme.

Grading system
IIT Kharagpur follows the credit-based system of performance evaluation, with proportional weighting of courses based on their importance. The total marks (usually out of 100) form the basis of grades, with a grade value (out of 10) assigned to a range of marks. For each semester, the students are graded by taking a weighted average from all the courses with their respective credit points. Each semester's evaluation is done independently with a cumulative grade point average (CGPA) reflecting the average performance across semesters.

Rankings

Internationally, IIT Kharagpur was ranked 270 in the QS World University Rankings of 2023 and 61 in Asia. It was also ranked 801–900 in the Academic Ranking of World Universities of 2022.

In India, IIT Kharagpur ranked 3rd among government engineering colleges by India Today in 2020, 4th among government engineering colleges by Outlook India in 2022 and fifth among engineering colleges by the National Institutional Ranking Framework (NIRF) in 2020, which also ranked it fifth overall.

The architecture department was ranked first among all architecture colleges in India by NIRF in 2020, Rajiv Gandhi School of Intellectual Property Law was ranked fourth among law schools and Vinod Gupta School of Management (VGSoM) was ranked fifth among management schools.

Placements at IIT Kharagpur
The international placements began in 2006. Two foreign companies, oil giants Schlumberger and Halliburton, visited IIT Kharagpur that year and offered annual salaries to the tune of $80,000. The reason for late international placements was that earlier the IIT, it had to abandon its policy.

The 2010 batch of BTech students saw 94% placements while the remaining preferred IIMs or entrepreneurship. For the 2012 batch, Facebook has made the highest offer $150,000 to four students.

As of the session 2021-2022, comprising both the phases of the placement drive, a total of 1723 offers (including PPOs) were made by several companies peaking with CTC of ₹2.4 Crore (US$301,014) per annum which is the highest CTC ever recorded in history of IITs.

Student life

General Championship
The students of IIT Kharagpur compete among themselves in various events held under the purview of open-IIT and inter-hall events, and the results of the latter contribute to the points that determine the winner of General Championship. The four categories in which General Championships are decided are Sports, Social and cultural activities, Technology, and Hall affairs. The women's hostel together participate as a single team in all events with the exception of sports, where women's team do not participate at inter-hall level. IIT Kharagpur participates in the Inter IIT Sports Meet, held annually in one of the IITs by policy of rotation. 
The students choose their representatives by elections held under the control of the Technology Students' Gymkhana. A fortnightly newsletter called The Scholar's Avenue, named after the avenue common to the student halls, is published by an independent student body. A Hindi monthly newsletter, Awaaz, is published by another independent student body. Individual halls organise "Hall day" — an annual event that involves lighting and decoration of the organising hall, with a social gathering of students from all halls—during March. The event is also used by the halls to popularise their candidates for student body elections.

Disciplinary Committee 
Students who violate the code of conduct of the institute have to defend themselves in front of the Hall Disciplinary Committee (HDC), which investigates the case and prescribes punishment if necessary. Students may appeal against the punishment to the Appellate-cum-Liaison Committee known as Inter Hall Disciplinary Committee (IHDC). The IHDC submits its recommendations to the Senate, which finalises the punishment. Extreme cases of indiscipline are referred directly to the IHDC. The IHDC is empowered to give punishments to students for acts of indiscretion committed anywhere in India. IIT Kharagpur has strict provisions dealing with physical and mental harassment of junior students (ragging). Students found harassing their juniors are suspended from the institute, without going through the Disciplinary Committee.

Cultural Festivals 

IIT Kharagpur has festivals like Spring Fest, Kshitij. Spring Fest, the annual socio-cultural fest of IIT Kharagpur is the largest student managed socio-cultural fest of Asia. It is held in January. Spring Fest includes cultural competitions in addition to stage shows (known as Star-nights) by singers and performers such as Sunidhi Chauhan, Farhan Akhtar, Salim-Sulaiman, Vishal–Shekhar, K.K., Pritam, Kailash Kher, Shaan, Breathe, Led Zepplica etc. The magnitude of Spring Fest is huge and attracts participation from more than 150 colleges across India. IIT Kharagpur organises a techno-management festival known as Kshitij. It is the biggest techno-management festival of Asia with a total budget of more than 15 million and a total prize money worth . An annual techno-management festival organised in January or February, it receives participation from foreign universities as well. Events include technical workshops, seminars, and competitions. To keep students updated with mordern technology and address their curosity the institute collaborates with other institutes to organise conferences and seminars.

Robotix, the annual robotics competition held by IIT Kharagpur, is organised during Kshitij. IIT Kharagpur organises an annual inter-collegiate sports and games meet known as Shaurya. It is held in the autumn semester in October. Events include cricket, hockey, volleyball, basketball, badminton, table tennis, lawn tennis and aquatics. Workshops for archery, boxing and handball are held.

The Department of Computer Science and Engineering organises Bitwise IIT Kharagpur, an online programming contest annually in February. Programming and algorithmic challenges are given in a span of 12 hours. In Bitwise 2011, 5000 teams participated from 80 countries. Bitwise 2012 was held on 12 February 2012.

In January the Entrepreneurship Cell organises a Global Entrepreneurship Summit, which consists of guest lectures, workshops, a start-up camp and other events relating to entrepreneurship and starting up.

There are also other department festivals like Esperanza (organised by department of Electronics and electrical communication engineering) Prithvi (organised by department of geology)

A petroleum-themed technical fest 'Petrofiesta' is organised in the month of November by the Society of Petroleum Engineers IIT Kharagpur Chapter. This is a one of a kind fest which provides a platform for students from all over the country to compete and share their ideas and knowledge in the field of petroleum industry.

Student organisations

Team KART (Kharagpur Automobile Racing Team)
Kharagpur Automobile Racing Team, better known as "Team KART" is a group of students who like to explore the practical side of automotive engineering. The team designs and builds formula student prototype race-cars and represents IIT Kharagpur at Formula Student UK & Formula Bharat. It was founded in 2008 and has made seven cars since—KX-1, K-1, K-2, K-2.2, K-3, K-4 & K-5. K-2 secured a rank of 67th out of 120 teams worldwide at Formula Student UK 2013. Several design oversights in K2 were fixed in K-2.2 by a new chassis and intake-exhaust system. The team participated in FDC 2015 and passed technical scrutiny and took part in dynamic events securing the first runners up position in Business Presentation and Cost Report, 2nd in Business Plan Presentation & 2nd in Cost and Manufacturing Report. With a new 3D printed intake in the K-3, the change in performance was significant. With K-4 the team participated in Formula Bharat 2019 and had it dyno tuned in Bangalore for better performance. The car K-5 saw a lot of improvement in the electronics subsystem design which included data acquisition system and a driver interface. The team participated in Formula Bharat 2020 with K-5 and brought great accolades to the institute by ranking 2nd in Business Plan Presentation, 6th in Engineering Design and 10th overall. K-5 was also the first car of the team to participate in all the dynamic events. The designing for the next car K-6 is ongoing.

Autonomous Ground Vehicle (AGV) Research Group, IIT Kharagpur 

Team AGV is a robotics research group in IIT Kharagpur. Sponsored by SRIC, IIT Kharagpur as part of Centre for Excellence in Robotics, it has been at the forefront of robotics research in the campus. The aim of the group is to build a successful Self-driving car for Indian roads. The team has tasted success in International competitions like Intelligent Ground Vehicle Competition, placing 2nd in 2018 and 6th in 2013. The team is also a top-13 participant of the Mahindra Rise Prize SDC challenge. The group performs cutting-edge research in field of robot design, robot control, computer vision, Simultaneous localization and mapping, AI and Motion planning. The group is headed by Prof. Debashish Chakravarty.

A group spin-off startup, SF-bay area based Auro Robotics (now acquired by RideCell) is at the forefront of Self Driving Car research around the world.

Kharagpur Robosoccer Students' Group (KRSSG) 

Kharagpur Robosoccer Students' Group, abbreviated to KRSSG, is one of IIT Kharagpur's first endeavours in robotics research. It is a research group sponsored by SRIC as part of Centre for Excellence in Robotics. The aim of the research group is to make autonomous soccer playing robots and participate in international competitions like RoboCup and Federation of International Robot-soccer Association (FIRA) Roboworld Cup. Students from all departments and years have been part of this including undergraduates and post-graduates. The principal investigator for the project is Prof. Jayanta Mukhopadhyay alongside Prof. A.K. Deb, Prof. D.K. Pratihar and Prof. Sudeshna Sarkar.

KRSSG participated in FIRA 2013 Malaysia, FIRA 2014 Beijing, China and FIRA 2015 Daejeon, South Korea, winning the bronze medal. Recently it also participated in the 3D Humanoid Simulation League 2016 held in Leipzig, Germany, winning 7th position.

Gopali Youth Welfare Society 
Gopali Youth Welfare Society is a government registered NGO run by students of IIT Kharagpur with the help of professors of IIT Kharagpur and local members of Gopali village. The main initiative of GYWS is an English Medium School, Jagriti Vidya Mandir. Quality education is provided absolutely free of cost to underprivileged children. The school is located in Tangasole village, Salua outside the IIT Kharagpur campus. There are about 200 students enrolled in the school from Nursery to Class V. Books, Uniform and transportation is provided to the kids.

Entrepreneurship Cell

Entrepreneurship Cell (E-Cell) is a student's organisation, functioning under STEP (Science and Technology Entrepreneurs' Park), from within the institute, with the aim of promoting entrepreneurship among students throughout India. It provides mentoring and support to start-up companies and helps them with financing, through Venture Capitalists and incubation, through STEP and SRIC, IIT Kharagpur.

It conducts two major events, the Global Entrepreneurship Summit(GES), which is a three-day event, held in January at the institute, and the Entrepreneurship Awareness Drive (EAD), a 20-day event, consisting of guest lectures in 20 cities across India. Knowledge Camp is conducted annually for the benefit of students within IIT-KGP, while the Innovation Platform and Fund-a-KGPian programs continue throughout the year, to recognise and support innovative ideas among students of IIT-KGP, besides workshops and guest lectures throughout the year.

Professors Sunil Handa, Anil K. Gupta, Sanjeev Bhikchandani, Vinod Dham, Arjun Malhotra, Rajat Sharma and Kiran Mazumdar-Shaw are some of the speakers who have delivered lectures within and outside IIT-KGP.

E-Cell has been instrumental in the establishment of Rajendra Mishra School of Engineering Entrepreneurship. The E-Cell has played a key role in the Deferred Placement Programme (DPP), whereby, a student can opt for placement a year after the completion of his/her course, in case they are involved in a start-up company. This is the first time such a programme is being offered at the undergraduate level in India.

Space Technology Student Society 
Space Technology Student Society (spAts) is a student initiative that functions as the official student body of Kalpana Chawla Space Technology Cell (KCSTC), the contact point of Indian Space Research Organisation (ISRO) at IIT Kharagpur. It is responsible for organising the annual Space themed-festival the "National Students' Space Challenge (NSSC)". NSSC is the country's first and the largest astronomy and space science themed fest. After its conception in 2011, it has grown exponentially to witness over 2000 participants in 2018. spAts has been constantly instrumental in organizing space-themed talks, sky gazing sessions, lectures, discussions and presentations within IIT Kharagpur. The group publishes a bi-semester newsletter, 'The Moonwalk', on latest ventures in space technology and various astronomy related articles.

Megalith – The Annual Civil Engineering Tech-Fest 
Megalith is the annual technical fest of the Department of Civil Engineering, Indian Institute of Technology, Kharagpur held under the aegis of the Civil Engineering Society, IIT Kharagpur and the patronage of the Institution of Civil Engineers (UK), IIT Kharagpur chapter.

Technology Filmmaking and Photography Society
Technology Filmmaking and Photography Society (TFPS) is the students' interest club of IIT Kharagpur which aims to provide a platform to students interested in filmmaking and photography to work together and pursue their interests. The society also organises special screenings of acclaimed independent films and workshops, inviting industry professionals.

Biswapati Sarkar of TVF fame is one of the founding members of the society. Alumni of the society have gone on to produce critically acclaimed documentaries and films such as The Unreserved. and pursuing careers in Filmmaking, Media and Advertising.

Alumni 

Alumni-institute interaction is maintained through the Alumni Network under the aegis of the Dean of Alumni Affairs and International Relations, his office staff and student representatives. It also helps in conducting the annual alumni meets.

Alumni initiatives 
 The Vinod Gupta School of Management (VGSOM) and Rajiv Gandhi School of Intellectual Property Law were established with donated funds from Vinod Gupta (founder, Infogroup) along with support from the government of India. VGSOM started in 1993 with a batch of 30 students. Other centres built by funding from alumni include the G.S. Sanyal School of Telecommunication and VLSI-CAD laboratory. The IIT Foundation, started by Vinod Gupta in 1992, is the alumni association of the institute with chapters in cities in India and abroad. Subrata Gupta is the Director of West Bengal Industrial Development Corporation. The alumni association publishes the quarterly newsletter KGPian for the alumni. The institute also publishes a monthly e-newsletter titled KGP Konnexion for alumni. IIT Kharagpur has a dean for alumni affairs to manage liaisons with alumni. The US-based alumni of IIT Kharagpur have started the Vision 2020 fundraiser, to provide infrastructure (like labs and equipment) and attract and retain faculty and students. The objective of Vision 2020 is to raise a $200 million endowment fund by 2020 for technology education, research and innovation related growth of the institute. On 20 April 2013 ex-graduates from IIT Kharagpur formed a group Kharagpur-in-Mumbai group and held a meeting in Bandra, Mumbai to chalk out "the easiest and pragmatic ways" on how they can given back to society.

References

Further reading

External links

 

 
Institutes of Eminence
Educational institutions established in 1951
Engineering colleges in West Bengal
Kharagpur
Universities and colleges in Paschim Medinipur district
Kharagpur
1951 establishments in West Bengal
Universities in West Bengal